Sandakshatru or Sandakuru (Akkadian:   or ) was the last known Cimmerian king.

Name 

Historical background

In the 8th and 7th centuries BC, a significant movement of the nomads of the Eurasian steppe brought the Scythians into Southwest Asia. According to Herodotus, this movement started when the Massagetae or the Issedones migrated westwards, forcing the Scythians to the west across the Araxes and into the Caspian Steppe, from where they displaced the Cimmerians.

Reign 
Around 680 BC, the Cimmerians separated into two groups, with their bulk having migrated to the west into Anatolia, while a smaller group remained in the east, in the area near the kingdom of Mannai and later migrated into Media.

Sandakšatru was the son of the previous Cimmerian king, Tugdammi, who had led the Cimmerians into invading the kingdoms of Phrygia, which was destroyed by the Cimmerians, and Lydia, whose king Gyges died during the invasion of his kingdom, and into several conflicts with the Neo-Assyrian Empire, which was the then superpower in Western Asia. After Tugdammi died of disease in 640 BC, Sandakšatru succeeded his father as the king of the Cimmerians.

After succeeding his father, Sandakšatru attempted to continue Tugdammi's attacks against Assyria but failed just like his father had.

Attacks on Lydia 
By the later part of the 7th century BC, the Cimmerians were nomadising in Western Asia together with the Thracian Treres tribe who had migrated across the Thracian Bosporus and invaded Anatolia. In 637 BC, Sandakšatru's Cimmerians participated in another attack on Lydia, this time led by the Treres under their king Kōbos, and in alliance with the Lycians. During this invasion, in the seventh year of the reign of Gyges's son Ardys, the Lydians were defeated again and for a second time their capital Sardis was captured, except for its citadel, and Ardys might have been killed in this attack. Ardys's son and successor, Sadyattes, might possibly also have been killed in another Cimmerian attack on Lydia.

Final defeat of the Cimmerians 

The power of the Cimmerians eventually dwindled quickly after Tugdammi's death. Soon after these Cimmerian attacks on Lydia, with Assyrian approval and in alliance with the Lydians, the Assyrians' Scythian allies under their king Madyes entered Anatolia. They expelled the Treres from Asia Minor and defeated the Cimmerians so that they no longer constituted a threat again. Following this, the Scythians extended their domination to Central Anatolia until they were themselves expelled by the Medes from Western Asia in the 600s BC. This final defeat of the Cimmerians was carried out by the joint forces of Madyes, whom Strabo credits with expelling the Cimmerians from Asia Minor, and of Gyges's great-grandson, the king Alyattes of Lydia, whom Herodotus of Halicarnassus and Polyaenus claim finally defeated the Cimmerians.

Aftermath
Following this final defeat, the Cimmerians likely remained in the region of Cappadocia, whose name in Armenian, may have been derived from the name of the Cimmerians. A group of Cimmerians might also have subsisted for some time in the Troad, around Antandrus, until they were finally defeated by Alyattes of Lydia. The remnants of the Cimmerians were eventually assimilated by the populations of Anatolia, and they completely disappeared from history after their defeat by Madyes and Alyattes.

References

Sources

 
 
 
 

7th-century BC rulers in Asia
Cimmerian rulers